Aleksander Ansberg (27 February 1909 – 20 February 1975) was an Estonian politician. He was a member of the Communist Party of Estonia.

Ansberg was born in Gatchina, in the Tsarskoselsky Uyezd of the Saint Petersburg Governorate of the Russian Empire. He was Deputy Chairman of the Estonian SSR Council of Ministers 1950–1953, Chairman of the Executive Committee of the Tallinn Oblast Soviet 1953, Minister of Culture 1953–1963, Deputy Chairman of the Presidium of the Supreme Soviet of the Estonian Soviet Socialist Republic and Acting Chairman of the Presidium of the Supreme Soviet of the Estonian Soviet Socialist Republic 7 October – 22 December 1970. He died on 20 February 1975 in Tallinn.

Orders 
1950: Order of Lenin
Two Orders of the Red Banner of Labour
Order of the Badge of Honour

References 

1909 births
1975 deaths
People from Gatchina
People from Tsarskoselsky Uyezd
Communist Party of Estonia politicians
Heads of state of the Estonian Soviet Socialist Republic
Members of the Supreme Soviet of the Estonian Soviet Socialist Republic, 1951–1955
Members of the Supreme Soviet of the Estonian Soviet Socialist Republic, 1955–1959
Members of the Supreme Soviet of the Estonian Soviet Socialist Republic, 1959–1963
Members of the Supreme Soviet of the Estonian Soviet Socialist Republic, 1963–1967
Members of the Supreme Soviet of the Estonian Soviet Socialist Republic, 1967–1971
Members of the Supreme Soviet of the Estonian Soviet Socialist Republic, 1971–1975
Recipients of the Order of Lenin
Recipients of the Order of the Red Banner of Labour
Burials at Metsakalmistu